Asplundianthus is a genus of flowering plants in the family Asteraceae.

The genus is named in honor of Swedish botanist Erik Asplund.

 Species
All known species are native to northwestern South America.

References

Eupatorieae
Flora of South America
Asteraceae genera